Soğucak is a village in the Alaca District of Çorum Province in Turkey. Its population is 30 (2022). The village is populated by Kurds.

References

Villages in Alaca District
Kurdish settlements in Çorum Province